Eric Brown (born 27 April 1969) is a weightlifter from American Samoa.

Brown competed at the 1992 Summer Olympics in the middle-heavyweight class, he finished 21st out of the 23 starters, four years later at the 1996 Summer Olympics he again entered the middle-heavyweight class this time he finished 22nd out of 25. He also competed at the 1993 World Weightlifting Championships where he finished 13th.

References

External links
 

1969 births
Living people
American Samoan male weightlifters
Olympic weightlifters of American Samoa
Weightlifters at the 1992 Summer Olympics
Weightlifters at the 1996 Summer Olympics